The Kawasaki Ninja 1000 SX (sold in some markets as the Ninja 1000, Z1000S or Z1000SX) is a motorcycle in the Ninja series from the Japanese manufacturer Kawasaki sold since 2011.

It is generally characterized as a fully faired sibling of the Z1000 streetfighter, sharing the same 1,043cc liquid-cooled, electronic fuel-injected, 16-valve four-stroke inline-four engine and aluminum twin-tube backbone frame, but with ergonomics, storage, larger fuel tank and other design elements more oriented to the sport touring market. The Ninja 1000 is also fitted with an electronic speed limiter, not because it is capable of exceeding the 300 km/h (186 mph) agreed to in the gentlemen's agreement but apparently to keep its top speed the same as the unfaired and unlimited Z1000.

Class 
Kawasaki has positioned the bike as a "sport bike for the real world." As the model will not be homologated for racing purposes, the designers were free to make compromises for street performance. The Ninja 1000 thus has an upright seating position, large fuel tank, and adjustable windscreen among its features, as well a transmission geared for street-riding as opposed to racing. Nevertheless, it retains the large engine and aggressive styling of a sport bike, and its performance characteristics remain on the sport end of the spectrum, placing its sports-touring type more in competition with bikes like the Honda VFR1200F or Triumph Sprint GT as opposed to the Kawasaki's Concours or Yamaha FJR1300.

History

2011-2013

2014-2016 
Main highlights of this series was the improved throttle response, and the addition of three-way traction control, along with two power modes as standard. ABS was also offered as an optional extra. Brakes were changed to Tokico with more bite. Suspension received a revised damping rate and shocks received heavier springs - both of which improve the ride quality. Other revisions included changes to the mirrors, seat, panniers and even some tweaks to the induction noise.

2017-2019 
The updated 2017 bike received a wider front fairing and a taller wind screen, also the addition of a brighter LED headlight replacing the previous halogen light. New high level electronics include the addition of a six-axis IMU that works with ABS and traction control - all of which is now referred to as Kawasaki's KTRC and KCMF (Kawasaki Cornering Management Function). ABS now comes as standard. Compliant with Euro 4 rules, furnished with new styling and capable of competing with Suzuki GSX-S1000F, KTM 1290 Super Duke GT, MV Agusta Turismo Veloce and the Ducati SuperSport of 2017, the bike will contribute to the regained strength of the sports-touring class.

Other changes include a re-designed dash with gear position indicator, changeable rev limiter and ambient temperature sensors. The exhaust system was also changed to conform to the Euro 4 rules.

2020 - 
Unlike previous versions which had 2 different names (Z 1000 SX or Ninja 1000) in different countries, the name Ninja 1000 SX now is used in every country.
This new version has the following changes :
 Single exhaust (on the right-hand side)
 Colour TFT dashboard with Bluetooth connectivity
 Up/down quickshifter
 Euro 5 ready
 Cruise control
 Thicker seat padding
 4 riding modes : Sport, Road, Rain, Rider (configurable)
 Shortened trail to enhance handling even more
 Revised fork internals to improve shock absorption
 S22 tyres
 Ride by wire (electronic throttle)
 Revised camshaft profiles with reduced tappet noise
 Two shorter  intake funnels on cylinders one and four

Specifications

References 

Ninja 1000
Sport touring motorcycles
Motorcycles introduced in 2011